The 1998–99 season of the Philippine Basketball League (PBL).

TV coverage
PTV 4, in partnership with Silverstar Sports as the line producer, covered the PBL games.

1998 (1st) Centennial Cup

Participating teams (coach)
Batang Red Bull (Nat Canson)
Dr.J Rubbing Alcohol (Leo Isaac)
Zest-O Juice Drink (Mollet Pineda) 
Welcoat Paints (Gabby Velasco)
Tanduay Centennial Rhum (Alfrancis Chua)
Chowking Oriental Fastfood (Arturo Cristobal)
Wilkins Distilled Water (Arlene Rodriguez)

Finals series

Tanduay scored a 3–0 sweep over Red Bull in the 1st Yakult-PBL Centennial Cup finals. The Rhum Masters clinch the title with a 71-65 victory in Game three.

1998-99 (2nd) Centennial Cup

Participating teams (coach)
Batang Red Bull (Nat Canson)
Dr.J Rubbing Alcohol/ANA Water Dispenser (Leo Isaac)
Welcoat Paints (Gabby Velasco)
Tanduay Centennial Rhum (Alfrancis Chua)
Chowking Oriental Fastfood (Leo Austria)
Blu Detergent *New team
Paralux Auto Paints *New team

Finals series

Tanduay Rhum Masters strung up 18 straight victories (18-0) in the 2nd Yakult-PBL Centennial Cup, before newcomer Blu Detergents halted their winning run. Tanduay wound up with a 19–1 win–loss record going into the finals.

Dr.J/ANA Water Dispenser won their first-ever PBL crown with a 3-2 series win over Tanduay and denied the Rhum Masters on what could have been a grand exit for the multi-titled ballclub as the Lucio Tan franchise leaped to the pro ranks.

All-Star game
A PBL All-Star game was held in December 1998, Tanduay's Eric Menk leads the PBL-UAAP selection while Asi Taulava of Blu Detergent beef up the PBL-NCAA Hapee selection. The North vs South All-Star game had Yakult-South being coach by Leo Austria while the North All-Stars was handled by Gabby Velasco.

Women's Philippine Basketball League (WPBL)
PBL Commissioner Yeng Guiao came up with the formation of the first-ever women's league in the PBL in mid-October to spice up the 2nd conference, among the teams which participated in the Women's Philippine Basketball League are Dr J/Ana Dispenser, Dreyers Ice Cream, Welcoat Paints, Ever Bilena, Tanduay, Chowking and Paralux/Ironcon. Notable WPBL cagebelles were former RP team members Mitchell Jimenez (Paralux), Ana Marie Tinasas (Dreyers), Joanna Franquelli (Ana Dispenser), Mary Ellen Caasi and Cherry Maralit (Welcoat), and four-time SEA games campaigner and silver medal winning-RP team in the Chiang Mai games, Julie Amos of Ever Bilena.

On December 28, 1998, Ever Bilena won the first Birch Tree-Women's PBL crown with a nail-biting 52-51 victory over Chowking at the Makati Coliseum.

References

External links
 www.philippinebasketball.ph

Philippine Basketball League seasons
PBL
League
League